Catasetum cernuum, the nodding catasetum, is a species of orchid found from Trinidad to Brazil.

References

External links 
 
 
 

cernuum
Orchids of Brazil
Orchids of Trinidad
Plants described in 1832